NeuroDancer: Journey Into the Neuronet! is a 1994 adult action-maze video game developed by American studio Electric Dreams and published by PIXIS Interactive in North America for the 3DO Interactive Multiplayer, Macintosh and Windows.

Gameplay 

NeuroDancer is primarily a maze game with action and adult elements that is played from a first-person perspective.

Development and release 

A port for the Atari Jaguar CD was in development and slated to be published by PIXIS Interactive around the second quarter of 1995, however, it was never released for unknown reasons.

Reception 

NeuroDancer: Journey Into the Neuronet! received negative reception from critics since its release.

References

External links 
 
 NeuroDancer: Journey Into the Neuronet! at GameFAQs
 NeuroDancer: Journey Into the Neuronet! at Giant Bomb
 NeuroDancer: Journey Into the Neuronet! at MobyGames

1994 video games
3DO Interactive Multiplayer games
Action video games
Cancelled Atari Jaguar games
Erotic video games
Classic Mac OS games
Maze games
North America-exclusive video games
Single-player video games
Video games developed in the United States
Video games featuring female protagonists
Windows games